Bykovo is a rural locality (a village) in Lavrovskoye Rural Settlement, Sudogodsky District, Vladimir Oblast, Russia. The population was 4 as of 2010.

Geography 
Bykovo is located 8 km north of Sudogda (the district's administrative centre) by road. Lukhtonovo is the nearest rural locality.

References 

Rural localities in Sudogodsky District